The arcuate ligament may refer to:
 Inferior pubic ligament (arcuate ligament of the pubis).
 Arcuate popliteal ligament.
 Arcuate ligaments of the diaphragm:
 Median arcuate ligament
 Medial arcuate ligament
 Lateral arcuate ligament

Ligaments